Forty Martyrs may refer to:

 Forty Martyrs of England and Wales, a group of Catholics martyred between 1535 and 1679
 Forty Martyrs of Sebaste, Roman soldiers martyred c. 320 in Roman Armenia
Forty Martyrs of Brazil a.k.a. Forty Martyrs of Tazacorte, a group of Jesuits en route to Brazil martyred in 1570 by Huguenot privateers

See also 
 Church of the Martyrs (disambiguation)